Wallace "Wally" Berman (February 18, 1926 – February 18, 1976) was an American experimental filmmaker, assemblage, and collage artist and a crucial figure in the history of post-war California art.

Personal life and education

Wallace Berman was born in Staten Island, New York in 1926. In the 1930s his family moved to Boyle Heights, Los Angeles. Berman was discharged from high school for gambling in the early 1940s and became involved in the West Coast jazz scene. Berman wrote a song with Jimmy Witherspoon. He attended classes at Jepson Art Institute and Chouinard Art Institute in the 1940s. For a few years from 1949 he worked in a factory finishing furniture. It was at the factory where he began creating sculptures from wood scraps. This led to him becoming a full-time artist by the early 1950s, and to an involvement in the Beat Movement. He married Shirley Morand (aka Shirley Berman) and together they had a son Tosh in 1954. He moved from Los Angeles to San Francisco in late 1957 where he mostly focused on his magazine Semina, which consisted of poetry, photographs, texts, drawings and images assembled by Berman. In 1961, he came back to L.A., then moved to Topanga Canyon in 1965. He started creating his series of Verifax Collages in 1963 or 1964. Director Dennis Hopper, a collector of Berman's work, gave Berman a small role in his 1969 film Easy Rider. He produced work until his sudden death in 1976, in a car accident caused by a drunk driver.  Berman had said to his mother as a child he would die on his 50th birthday, and indeed he died February 18, 1976, his fiftieth birthday.

Artistic career

Berman created Verifax collages, which consist of photocopies of images from magazines and newspapers, mounted onto a flat surface in collage fashion, mixed with occasional solid areas of acrylic paint. To make them, Berman used a Verifax copier (Kodak) machine to copy images which he often juxtaposed in a grid format, creating what the critic Will Fenstermaker called "psychedelic typologies."

Berman was influenced by jazz music, rock music, poetry of his Beat circle, Surrealism, Dada, as well as the Kabbalah. Though he was not religious, the influence of the Kabbalah and Jewish mysticism is seen in his collages that included Hebrew letters. These letters also appear in his only film, Aleph. His involvement with the jazz scene allowed him opportunities to work with jazz musicians, creating bebop album covers for Charlie Parker.

In 1957 Berman had his first exhibition of his artworks at the newly opened Ferus Gallery in Los Angeles. His friends were the curators/owners of the gallery, Ed Kienholz, Robert Alexander and Walter Hopps. After the opening, the L.A. vice squad got a telephone tip from an anonymous caller and during the raid they found what was deemed to be a pornographic image by Cameron Parsons titled Peyote Vision at the bottom of one of Berman's assemblage works called Temple. He later was convicted of displaying lewd and obscene materials. At the summation in the courtroom, Berman wrote on the blackboard "There is no justice, only revenge". His actor-friend Dean Stockwell paid the $150 fine to release Berman. Ferus was the last showing in a public gallery for Berman during his life.

Semina
His mail art publication Semina was a series of folio packages that were limited edition and sent or given to his friends. Semina consisted of collages mixed with poetry by writers Michael McClure, Philip Lamantia, David Meltzer, Charles Bukowski, William S. Burroughs, Allen Ginsberg, Jean Cocteau, John Kelly Reed and Berman, which he published under the pseudonym Pantale Xantos. Semina was published from 1955 to 1964. The cover of the first issue of Semina featured a photograph of artist and occultist Marjorie Cameron. The volume also included Cameron's drawing, Peyote Vision. This artwork was featured in Berman's 1957 exhibition at Los Angeles' Feris Gallery, which was raided and shut down by police. Investigating officers claimed that Peyote Vision, which featured two copulating figures, was pornographic and indecent, thus legitimizing their actions.

Aleph
Berman created a 6 minute 8mm silent experimental film entitled Aleph that he worked on from 1958 to 1976. Berman began work on Aleph soon after the release of the first issues of Semina, and the film incorporated techniques carried over from collage and painting. The film includes hand coloring, Letraset symbols, and collage portraits of pop-culture icons, which Berman superimposed on images of a Sony transistor radio. After Berman's death, filmmaker Stan Brakhage salvaged the film and enlarged it to 16mm for public screening. The film was named Aleph by Berman’s son Tosh, after the first letter of the Hebrew alphabet which had been adopted by his father as a monogram.

Legacy
Berman's likeness appears on the album cover of the Beatles' 1967 Sgt. Pepper's Lonely Hearts Club Band. The portrait is from a photograph taken by Dean Stockwell. It is directly above John Lennon, two rows up, next to Tony Curtis. In 1992 Berman's papers were donated to the Archives of American Art by his son Tosh Berman.

Notable exhibitions
Wallace Berman - Visual Music, 2018, galerie frank elbaz, Paris
Looking for Mushrooms, 2008, Ludwig Museum
Trace du Sacre, 2008; Centre Pompidou
Los Angeles 1955-1985 2006; Centre Pompidou
California Modern, 2006; Orange County Museum of Art
Subway Series: The New York Yankees and the American Dream, 2004; Bronx Museum of the Arts
Evidence of Impact: Art and Photography 1963-1978, 2004; Whitney Museum of American Art
Solo exhibition: Ferus Gallery, Los Angeles, 1957

Notable collections
Untitled, 1967; Norton Simon Museum
 di Rosa Collection 
 Richard Prince private collection
 Museum of Contemporary Art, Los Angeles

References

Further reading

 Glicksman et al. Wallace Berman: Retrospective. Otis Art Institute Gallery, Los Angeles. Los Angeles: Fellows of Contemporary Art (1978).
Support the Revolution. Institute of Contemporary Art, Amsterdam. New York: Distributed Art Publishers (1992). 
 Sophie Dannenmüller: "In Fac Simile Veritas, les Verifax Collages de Wallace Berman," Les Cahiers du Musée national d'art moderne, Editions du Centre Pompidou, Paris, n° 92, summer 2005, p. 130-143
Fredman, Stephen and Michael Duncan. Semina Culture: Wallace Berman & His Circle. Santa Monica: Santa Monica Museum of Art (2005). 
Dannenmüller, Sophie. Wallace Berman - Verifax Collages. Paris: frank elbaz gallery (2009)
Dannenmüller, Sophie. Wallace Berman - Be-Bop Kabbalah. Paris: frank elbaz gallery (2010)
Bradnock, Lucy. ""Mantras of Gibberish": Wallace Berman's Visions of Artaud". Art History, vol. 35 (3), June 2012, pp. 622–643]    
 Sophie Dannenmüller, De la poésie au collage, du cinéma au graffiti, Sillages critiques 21 | 2016, 
 Dannenmüller, Sophie. Wallace Berman - Visual Music. Paris: frank elbaz gallery (2018)

External links

City of Degenerate Angels: Wallace Berman, Jazz and Semina in Postwar Los Angeles by Ken D. Allan in Art Journal
galerie frank elbaz: Wallace Berman estate
Wallace Berman at Kadist Art Foundation
Wallace Berman Ferus Gallery archive page

1926 births
1976 deaths
People from Staten Island
People from Boyle Heights, Los Angeles
Beat Generation people
Jewish American artists
Assemblage artists
People from Topanga, California
Collage filmmakers
Road incident deaths in California
20th-century American Jews